Gary Milton Pemberton  (born 1940) is an Australian business executive.

Pemberton is best known for being the former chairman of Brambles, Qantas (1993-2000), TAB, Racing NSW and Billabong.

He was president of the Sydney Organising Committee for the Olympic Games and a commissioner for the Australian Rugby League Commission. Pemberton was on the boards of companies such as Rio Tinto, the Commonwealth Bank and John Fairfax Holdings.

Pemberton was made a Companion of the Order of Australia in the 1999 Queen's Birthday Honours in recognition of his service to business, finance, public service reform and the community.

References 

Australian business executives
1940 births
Living people
Companions of the Order of Australia
Qantas people